The jal tarang (Hindi: जलतरंग) is a melodic percussion instrument that originates from the Indian subcontinent. It consists of a set of ceramic or metal bowls filled with water. The bowls are played by striking the edge with beaters, one in each hand.

History
The earliest mention of the Jaltarang is found in 'Vatsyayana's Kamasutra' as playing on musical glasses filled with water. Jal-tarang was also mentioned in the medieval Sangeet Parijaat text, which categorized this instrument under Ghan-Vadya (idiophonic instruments in which sound is produced by striking a surface, also called concussion idiophones.) The SangeetSaar text considers 22 cups to be a complete jal tarang and 15 cups to be one of mediocre status. The cups, of varying sizes, are made of either bronze or porcelain. Jal-tarang was also called jal-yantra in medieval times, and poets of the Krishna cult (also called Ashtachhap poets) have mentioned this instrument.

In modern days, it has fallen into obscurity. Literally, jal tarang means 'waves in water', but it indicates motion of sound created or modified with the aid of water. Among wave-instruments, it is the most prominent and ancient. This traditional instrument is used in Indian classical music. Some scholars think that in the ancient period these were in routine use around the eastern border of India.

Details

Today only porcelain bowls are preferred by artists. Cups for Manda Swar (notes of lower octave) are large while those for Taar Swar (notes of higher octaves) are smaller in size. Water is poured into the cups and the pitch is changed by adjusting the volume of water. The number of cups depends on the melody being played. The bowls are mostly arranged in a semicircle in front of the player, who can then reach them all easily. The player softly hits the cups with a wooden stick on the border to obtain the sound. Tuning the instrument isn't easy and requires some skill. While playing, fine nuances can be obtained if the performer is accomplished. SangeetSaar mentions that if the player can rotate the water through a quick light touch of the stick, nuances and finer variations of the note can be achieved.

See also
 Water drum
 Hydraulophone

References

External links

Indian musical instruments
Pitched percussion instruments